Marlborough is a suburb of the North Shore, located in Auckland, New Zealand. It lies eight kilometres to the northwest of the Auckland CBD between the suburbs of Hillcrest and Glenfield.

In 2013 this suburb comprised part of the Northcote electorate and is represented by the Member of Parliament Dan Bidois, of the National Party.

Education
Marlborough School is a coeducational contributing primary (years 1–6) school with a decile rating of 7 and a roll of 274.

References
 Northcote electoral profile
 Map showing the location of Marlborough

External links
 Marlborough School website

Kaipātiki Local Board Area
Suburbs of Auckland
North Shore, New Zealand